The 2015–16 Appalachian State Mountaineers men's basketball team represented Appalachian State University during the 2015–16 NCAA Division I men's basketball season. The Mountaineers, led by second year head coach Jim Fox, played their home games at the George M. Holmes Convocation Center and were members of the Sun Belt Conference. They finished the season 9–22, 7–13 in Sun Belt play to finish in a tie for ninth place. They failed to qualify for the Sun Belt tournament.

Roster

Schedule

|-
!colspan=9 style="background:#000000; color:#FFCF00;"| Exhibition

|-
!colspan=9 style="background:#000000; color:#FFCF00;"| Regular season

References

Appalachian State Mountaineers men's basketball seasons
Appalachian State
Appalachian State
Appalachian State